Howard Bushong is a former baseball coach at the high school, college, and minor league levels.  He has moved between the college and professional levels several times, most recently coaching the Connecticut Tigers of the Class A New York–Penn League.  He previously coached at Texas State as both a head coach (when it was known at Southwest Texas State) and an assistant, as well as the rookie league GCL Tigers and AZL Padres.

Playing career
Bushong played for Texas from 1975–77, including the Longhorns championship run through the 1975 College World Series.

Coaching career
Bushong began his coaching career at Tuloso Midway High School in Corpus Christi, TX. His next assignment was at Austin Westlake High School, winning two Texas state championships and amassing a 311–84 record over twelve years.

College coaching career
Bushong became an assistant coach at his alma mater, Texas, in 1990.  After foure seasons, he took over as head coach of Southwest Texas State.  Bushong led Southwest Texas State to their first ever division championships (Southland Texas Division, 1996 and 1997), Southland Conference baseball tournament title, and NCAA Tournament appearance in 1997.  He was named Southland Coach of the Year in 1996.  His final season as head coach of SW Texas State was 1999, during which he again led the Bobcats to the Southland Tournament championship.

Following four seasons coaching at the minor league level, Bushong returned to the Bobcats, now known as Texas State, serving as an assistant coach to his successor, Ty Harrington, from 2004–2009.

Professional coaching career
In his first foray into managing at the professional level, Bushong took over the San Diego Padres affiliate AZL Padres for the 2000 season.  He then took over the GCL Tigers, an affiliate of the Detroit Tigers.  After three seasons with the Tigers organization, he returned to college coaching at Texas State.

In 2009, Bushong returned to professional ranks taking over the Class A Oneonta Tigers, who later moved to Norwich, Connecticut, to become the Connecticut Tigers.  Bushong's final season as manager was 2010.

Head coaching record
The following is a listing of Bushong's record as a head coach at the college level.

References

1953 births
Texas State Bobcats baseball coaches
Texas Longhorns baseball coaches
Texas Longhorns baseball players
Living people
Minor league baseball managers